Playing with Fire may refer to:

Film 
 Playing with Fire (1916 film), an American silent film
 Playing with Fire (1921 German film), a silent comedy-drama film
 Playing with Fire (1921 American film), a silent comedy film
 Playing with Fire (1934 film), a German film
 Playing with Fire (1975 film), a French-Italian film
 Playing with Fire (1985 film), an American TV film starring Gary Coleman
 Playing with Fire (2008 film), a film by David DeCoteau
 Playing with Fire (2019 film), a film directed by Andy Fickman
 Dangerous Encounters of the First Kind, a 1980 Hong Kong film released in some regions as Playing with Fire

Literature

Fiction
 Playing with Fire (Robinson novel), a 2004 Inspector Banks novel by Peter Robinson
 Playing with Fire (Vailland novel), a 1945 novel by Roger Vailland
 Skulduggery Pleasant: Playing with Fire, a 2008 novel by Derek Landy
 Playing with Fire, a novel by Melody Carlson
 Playing with Fire, a 1997 novel by Esther Friesner
 Playing with Fire, a 2015 novel by Tess Gerritsen 
 Playing with Fire, a 2015 novel by Renee Graziano
 Playing with Fire, a 1983 novel by  Jo Jung-rae
 Playing with Fire, a 1981 novel by Charlotte Lamb writing as Sheila Holland
 Playing with Fire, a 2002 novel by Henning Mankell
 Playing with Fire, a 2008 novel by Francine Pascal
 Playing with Fire, a 2017 novel by Katie Price
 Playing with Fire, a 1990 novel by Dani Shapiro
 Playing with Fire, a 2006 novel by Gena Showalter 
 Playing with Fire, a 2013 novel by Kerry Wilkinson
 "Playing with Fire", a 1900 short story by Arthur Conan Doyle

Nonfiction
 Playing with Fire (Fleury book), a 2009 autobiography by Theoren Fleury
 Playing with Fire (Moody Press), a 1984 Christian book by John Weldon and James Bjornstad
Playing with Fire: Queer Politics, Queer Theories, a 1997 essay collection edited by Shane Phelan
 Playing with Fire, a 2004 autobiography by Nasser Hussain
 Playing with Fire: The 1968 Election and the Transformation of American Politics, a 2017 book by Lawrence O'Donnell

Drama
 Playing with Fire (Edgar play), a 2005 play by David Edgar
 Playing with Fire, an 1893 play by August Strindberg

Poetry
 Playing with Fire, a 2006 poetry collection by Grevel Lindop

Music

Albums 
 Playing with Fire (Aria album) or the title song, 1989
 Playing with Fire (Kevin Federline album) or the title song, 2006
 Playing with Fire (Jennifer Nettles album) or the title song, 2016
 Playing with Fire (Spacemen 3 album), 1989
 Playing with Fire, by Dervish, 1995
 Playing with Fire, by Dave Kilminster, 2004
 Playing with Fire, by Frank Yamma and Piranpa, 1999
 Playing with Fire, by Paula Seling and Ovi, 2010

Songs 
 "Playing with Fire" (Blackpink song), 2016
 "Playing with Fire" (Darin song), 2013
 "Playing with Fire" (Liam Cacatian Thomassen song), 2016
 "Playing with Fire" (N-Dubz song), 2010
 "Playing with Fire" (Paula Seling and Ovi song), 2010
 "Playing with Fire" (Plan B song), 2012
 "Playing with Fire", by Brad Paisley from Play: The Guitar Album, 2008
 "Playing with Fire", by Brandon Flowers from Flamingo, 2010
 "Playing with Fire", by Bullet for My Valentine from Temper Temper, 2013
 "Playing with Fire", by Chelsea Grin from Ashes to Ashes, 2014
 "Playing with Fire", by Crowded House from Dreamers Are Waiting, 2021
 "Playing with Fire", by Dead by April from Worlds Collide, 2017
 "Playing with Fire", by Emery from The Question, 2005
 "Playing with Fire", by Forever the Sickest Kids from J.A.C.K., 2013
 "Playing with Fire", by Gina, Dale Haze and the Champions, 1985
 "Playing with Fire", by Godflesh from Decline & Fall, 2014
 "Playing with Fire", by Lil Wayne from Tha Carter III, 2008
 "Playing with Fire", by Richard Marx from Rush Street, 1991
 "Playing with Fire", by Shannon Curfman from Loud Guitars, Big Suspicions, 1999
 "Playing with Fire", by Thomas Rhett from Tangled Up, 2015

Television

Series
 Playing with Fire (2013 TV series), an American reality documentary series
 Playing with Fire (2019 TV series), an American Netflix series

Episodes
 "Playing with Fire" (The Bill)
 "Playing with Fire" (Dante's Cove)
 "Playing with Fire" (NCIS)
 "Playing with Fire" (SeaChange)

See also 
 Play with Fire (disambiguation)